William Francis Murphy (April 13, 1890July 19, 1949) was an American politician, lawyer and jurist from Michigan. He was a Democrat who was named to the Supreme Court of the United States in 1940 after a political career that included serving as United States Attorney General, 35th governor of Michigan, and the mayor of Detroit. He also served as the last governor-general of the Philippines and the first high commissioner of the Philippines.

Born in "The Thumb" region of Michigan, Murphy graduated from the University of Michigan Law School in 1914. After serving in the United States Army during World War I, he served as a federal attorney and trial judge. He served as Mayor of Detroit from 1930 to 1933 before accepting his appointment as Governor-General of the Philippine Islands. He defeated incumbent Republican Governor Frank Fitzgerald in Michigan's 1936 gubernatorial election and served a single term as Governor of Michigan. Murphy lost re-election to Fitzgerald in 1938 and accepted an appointment as the United States Attorney General the following year.

In 1940, President Franklin D. Roosevelt appointed Murphy to the Supreme Court to fill a vacancy caused by the death of Pierce Butler. Murphy served on the Court from 1940 until his death in 1949, and was succeeded by Tom C. Clark. Murphy wrote the Court's majority opinion in SEC v. W. J. Howey Co., and wrote a dissenting opinion in Korematsu v. United States.

Early life
Murphy was born in Harbor Beach (then called Sand Beach), Michigan, in 1890. Both his parents, John T. Murphy and Mary Brennan, were Irish immigrants and raised him as a devout Catholic. He followed in his father's footsteps by becoming a lawyer. He attended the University of Michigan Law School, and graduated with a BA in 1912 and an LLB in 1914. He was a member of the Sigma Chi Fraternity and the senior society Michigamua.

Murphy was admitted to the State Bar of Michigan in 1914, after which he clerked with a Detroit law firm for three years. He then served with the American Expeditionary Forces in Europe during World War I, achieving the rank of captain with the occupation army in Germany before leaving the service in 1919. He remained abroad afterward to pursue graduate studies. He did his graduate work at Lincoln's Inn in London and Trinity College, Dublin, which was said to be formative for his judicial philosophy. He developed a need to decide cases based on his more holistic notions of justice, eschewing technical legal arguments. As one commentator quipped of his later Supreme Court service, he "tempered justice with Murphy."

Career

1919–1922: U.S. Attorney, Eastern District of Michigan
Murphy was appointed and took the oath of office as the first Assistant United States Attorney for the Eastern District of Michigan on August 9, 1919. He was one of three assistant attorneys in the office.

When Murphy began his career as a federal attorney, the workload of the attorney's office was increasing at a rapid rate, mainly because of the number of prosecutions resulting from the enforcement of national prohibition. The government's excellent record in winning convictions in the Eastern District was partially due to Murphy's record of winning all but one of the cases he prosecuted. He practiced law privately to a limited extent while still a federal attorney, and resigned his position as a United States attorney on March 1, 1922. He had several offers to join private practices, but decided to go it alone and formed a partnership with Edward G. Kemp in Detroit.

1923–1930: Recorder's Court
Murphy ran unsuccessfully as a Democrat for the United States Congress in 1920, when national and state Republicans swept Michigan, but used his legal reputation and growing political connections to win a seat on the Recorder's Court, Detroit's criminal court. In 1923, he was elected judge of the Recorder's Court on a non-partisan ticket by one of the largest majorities ever cast for a judge in Detroit, took office on January 1, 1924, and served seven years during the Prohibition era.

While on Recorder's Court, he established a reputation as a trial judge. He was a presiding judge in the famous murder trials of Dr. Ossian Sweet and his brother, Henry Sweet, in 1925 and 1926. Clarence Darrow, then one of the most prominent trial lawyers in the country, was lead counsel for the defense. After an initial mistrial of all of the black defendants, Henry Sweet—who admitted that he fired the weapon which killed a member of the mob surrounding Dr. Sweet's home and was retried separately—was acquitted by an all-white jury on grounds of the right of self-defense. The prosecution then elected to not prosecute any of the remaining defendants. Murphy's rulings were material to the outcome of the case.

1930–1933: Mayor of Detroit
In 1930, Murphy ran as a Democrat and was elected Mayor of Detroit. He served from 1930 to 1933, during the first years of the Great Depression. He presided over an epidemic of urban unemployment, a crisis in which 100,000 were unemployed in the summer of 1931. He named an unemployment committee of private citizens from businesses, churches, and labor and social service organizations to identify all residents who were unemployed and not receiving welfare benefits. The Mayor's Unemployment Committee raised funds for its relief effort and worked to distribute food and clothing to the needy, and a Legal Aid Subcommittee volunteered to assist with the legal problems of needy clients. In 1933, Murphy convened in Detroit and organized the first convention of the United States Conference of Mayors. They met and conferred with President Franklin D. Roosevelt, and Murphy was elected its first president. He served in that position from 1932 until 1933.

Murphy was an early and enthusiastic supporter of Roosevelt and the New Deal, helping Roosevelt to become the first Democratic presidential candidate to win the state of Michigan since Franklin Pierce in 1852 before the Republican Party was founded.

A 1993 survey of historians, political scientists, and urban experts conducted by Melvin G. Holli of the University of Illinois at Chicago saw Murphy ranked as the seventh-best American big-city mayor to serve between the years 1820 and 1993. Holli wrote that Murphy was an exemplary mayor and a highly effective leader.

1933–1935: Governor-General of the Philippine Islands
By 1933, after Murphy's second mayoral term, the reward of a big government job was waiting. Roosevelt appointed Murphy as Governor-General of the Philippine Islands.

He was sympathetic to the plight of ordinary Filipinos, especially the land-hungry and oppressed tenant farmers, and emphasized the need for social justice.

1935–1936: High Commissioner to the Philippines
When his position as Governor-General was abolished in 1935, he stayed on as United States High Commissioner until 1936. That year, he was a delegate from the Philippine Islands to the Democratic National Convention.

High Commissioner to the Philippines was the title of the personal representative of the President of the United States to the Commonwealth of the Philippines during the period 1935–46. The office was created by the Tydings–McDuffie Act of 1934, which provided for a period of transition from direct American rule to the complete independence of the islands on July 4, 1946.

1937–1939: Governor of Michigan

Murphy was elected the 35th Governor of Michigan on November 3, 1936, defeating Republican incumbent Frank Fitzgerald, and served one two-year term. During his two years in office, an unemployment compensation system was instituted and mental health programs were improved.

The United Automobile Workers engaged in an historic sit-down strike at General Motors' Flint plant. The Flint Sit-Down Strike was a turning point in national collective bargaining and labor policy. After 27 people were injured in a battle between the workers and the police, including 13 strikers with gunshot wounds, Murphy sent the National Guard to protect the workers, failed to follow a court order that requested him to expel the strikers, and refused to order the Guard's troops to suppress the strike.

He successfully mediated an agreement and end to the confrontation, and G.M. recognized the U.A.W. as a bargaining agent under the newly adopted National Labor Relations Act. This recognition had a significant effect on the growth of organized labor unions. In the next year, the UAW saw its membership grow from 30,000 to 500,000 members. As later noted by the British Broadcasting Corporation (BBC), this strike was "the strike heard round the world."

In 1938, Murphy was defeated by his predecessor, Fitzgerald, who became the only governor of Michigan to precede, and then succeed, the same person.

1939–1940: Attorney General of the United States
In 1939, Roosevelt appointed Murphy the 56th Attorney General of the United States. He established a Civil Liberties Unit in the Criminal Division of the United States Department of Justice, designed to centralize enforcement responsibility for the Bill of Rights and civil rights statutes.

1940–1949: Supreme Court and military service
One year after becoming Attorney General, on January 4, 1940, Murphy was nominated by President Roosevelt as Associate Justice of the Supreme Court, filling the vacancy caused by the death of Pierce Butler the previous November. He was confirmed by the United States Senate on January 16, and sworn in on February 5, 1940. The timing of the appointment put Murphy on the cusp of the Charles Evans Hughes and the Harlan Fiske Stone courts. On the death of Chief Justice Stone, Murphy served in the court led by Frederick Moore Vinson, who was confirmed in 1946. During World War II he served in the Army Reserve during three months of 1942 while the court was in recess. He served as the executive officer to the Chief of Staff of the United States Army George C. Marshall. He retired with the rank of Lieutenant Colonel.

Murphy took an expansive view of individual liberties, and the limitations on government he found in the Bill of Rights. He authored 199 opinions: 131 for the majority, 68 in dissent.  One of the important opinions authored by Justice Murphy was Securities and Exchange Commission v. W. J. Howey Co. (1946), in which the Court defined the term "investment contract" under the Securities Act of 1933, thus giving content to the most important concept of what makes something a security in American law.

Opinions differ about him and his jurisprudential philosophy. He has been acclaimed as a legal scholar and a champion of the common man, but Justice Felix Frankfurter disparagingly nicknamed Murphy "the Saint", criticizing his decisions as being rooted more in passion than reason. It has been said he was "neither legal scholar nor craftsman", and he was criticized "for relying on heart over head, results over legal reasoning, clerks over hard work, and emotional solos over team play."

Murphy's support of African Americans, aliens, criminals, dissenters, Jehovah's Witnesses, Native Americans, women, workers and other "outsiders" evoked a pun: "tempering justice with Murphy." As he wrote in Falbo v. United States (1944), "The law knows no finer hour than when it cuts through formal concepts and transitory emotions to protect unpopular citizens against discrimination and persecution." (p. 561)

According to Frankfurter, Murphy was part of the more liberal "axis" of justices on the Court along with justices Wiley B. Rutledge, William O. Douglas and Hugo L. Black; the group would for years oppose Frankfurter's "judicially restrained" conservative ideology. Douglas, Murphy and then Rutledge were the first justices to agree with Black's notion that the Fourteenth Amendment incorporated the Bill of Rights' protection in it; this view would later become law.

Murphy is perhaps best known for his vehement dissent from the court's ruling in Korematsu v. United States (1944), which upheld the constitutionality of the government's internment of Japanese-Americans during World War II. He sharply criticized the majority ruling as "legalization of racism."

This was the first time the word "racism" found its way into a Supreme Court opinion (Murphy had previously used the term twice in a concurring opinion in Steele v. Louisville & Nashville Railway Co. (1944) issued that same day). He would use that word again in five separate opinions before the word "racism" disappeared from Murphy's and the High Court's other opinions for almost two decades, not reappearing until the landmark  decision of Loving v. Virginia (1967), which struck down as unconstitutional the Virginia anti-miscegenation statute. (See also Jim Crow laws.)

Although Murphy was serving on the Supreme Court during World War II, he still longed to be part of the war effort; and so during Court recesses he served at Fort Benning, Georgia as an infantry officer.

On January 30, 1944, almost exactly one year before Soviet liberation of the Auschwitz death camp on January 27, 1945, Justice Murphy unveiled the formation of the National Committee Against Nazi Persecution and Extermination of the Jews. Serving as committee chair, he declared that it was created to combat Nazi propaganda "breeding the germs of hatred against Jews."  This announcement was made on the 11th anniversary of Adolf Hitler's appointment as Chancellor of Germany. The eleven committee members included U.S. Vice President Henry Wallace, 1940 Republican presidential candidate Wendell Willkie and Henry St. George Tucker, Presiding Bishop of the Protestant Episcopal Church.

Murphy was among 12 nominated at the 1944 Democratic National Convention to serve as Roosevelt's running mate in the presidential election that year. He acted as chairman of the National Committee against Nazi Persecution and Extermination of the Jews and of the Philippine War Relief Committee. The first committee was established in early 1944 to promote rescue of European Jews, and to combat antisemitism in the United States.

Death and memory
Murphy died in his sleep at Henry Ford Hospital in Detroit on July 19, 1949, of a coronary thrombosis at the age of 59. Over 10,000 people attended his funeral in Detroit. He is buried in Our Lady of Lake Huron Catholic Cemetery in Sand Beach Township, Michigan, near Harbor Beach.

The Frank Murphy Hall of Justice was home to Detroit's Recorder's Court and now houses part of Michigan's Third Judicial Circuit Court. There is a plaque in his honor on the first floor, which is recognized as a Michigan Legal Milestone.

Outside the Hall of Justice is Carl Milles's statue "The Hand of God". This rendition was cast in honor of Murphy and financed by the United Automobile Workers. It features a nude figure emerging from the left hand of God. Although commissioned in 1949 and completed by 1953, the work, partly because of the male nudity involved, was kept in storage for a decade and a half. The work was chosen in tribute to Murphy by Walter P. Reuther and Ira W. Jayne. It was placed on a pedestal in 1970 with the help of sculptor Marshall Fredericks, who was a Milles student.

Murphy is also honored with a museum in his home town, Harbor Beach, Michigan. Housed at his former residence, it contains numerous personal artifacts from his life and career, most notably from the Philippines. The Murphy Museum is open during the summer months, by appointment.

Murphy's personal and official files are archived at the Bentley Historical Library of the University of Michigan in Ann Arbor and are open for research. This also includes an oral history project about Murphy. His correspondence and other official documents are deposited in libraries around the country.

In memory of Murphy, one of three University of Michigan Law School alumni to become a U.S. Supreme Court justice, Washington, D.C.-based attorney John H. Pickering, who was a law clerk for Murphy, donated a large sum of money to the law school as a remembrance, establishing the Frank Murphy Seminar Room.

Murphy was awarded an Honorary Doctorate of Law degree by the University of Michigan in 1939.

The University of Detroit has a Frank Murphy Honor Society.

The Sweet Trials: Malice Aforethought is a play written by Arthur Beer, based on the trials of Ossian and Henry Sweet, and derived from Kevin Boyle's Arc of Justice.

The Detroit Public Schools named Frank Murphy Elementary in his honor.

Personal life

Justice Murphy was the subject of "[r]umors of homosexuality [...] all his adult life". According to Courting Justice: Gay Men and Lesbians v. The Supreme Court:
[a] gay reading of [biographies of Murphy] suggests that Murphy's homosexuality was hiding in plain sight. For more than 40 years, Edward G. Kemp was Frank Murphy's devoted, trusted companion. Like Murphy, Kemp was a lifelong bachelor. From college until Murphy's death, the pair found creative ways to work and live together. [...] When Murphy appeared to have the better future in politics, Kemp stepped into a supportive, secondary role, much as Hillary Clinton would later do for Bill Clinton.

As well as Murphy's close relationship with Kemp, Murphy's biographer, historian Sidney Fine, found in Murphy's personal papers a letter that "if the words mean what they say, refers to a homosexual encounter some years earlier between Murphy and the writer." The writer of the letter implied that he and Murphy had become lovers while Murphy was governor-general and congratulated Murphy on his appointment to the Supreme Court.

Murphy did have at least two female companions of note. Ann Parker was frequently seen horseback riding with Murphy in Washington during his tenure as U.S. attorney general, leading to speculation of a romance in the press. At the time of his death, Murphy was engaged to Joan Cuddihy; the wedding was scheduled for the following month.

See also

 Demographics of the Supreme Court of the United States
 Ford Hunger March
 List of justices of the Supreme Court of the United States
 List of United States Supreme Court justices by time in office
 List of University of Michigan law and government alumni
 United States Supreme Court cases during the Hughes Court
 United States Supreme Court cases during the Stone Court
 United States Supreme Court cases during the Vinson Court

Bibliography

General
 
 
 
 Howard, J. Woodford, Mr. Justice Murphy: A Political Biography (Princeton, N.J.: Princeton University Press, 1968).

Footnotes

Notes

Further reading

 
 Frank Murphy, American National Biography.
 Ariens, Michael, Supreme Court Justices, Frank Murphy (1890–1949).
 Arnold, Thurman Wesley. "Mr. Justice Murphy." 63 Harvard Law Review 289 (1949).
 Bak, Richard, "(Frank) Murphy's Law", Hour Detroit, September 2008. 
 Baulch, Vivian M. and Zacharias, Patricia, Rearview Mirror, "The Historic 1936–37 Flint Auto Plant Strike", The Detroit News.
 Barnet, Vincent M., Jr. "Mr. Justice Murphy, Civil Liberties and the Holmes' Tradition." 32 Cornell Law Quarterly 177 (1946).
 Bibliography and Biography, William Francis "Frank" Murphy, 6th Circuit United States Court of Appeals.
 Biographical Dictionary of the Federal Judiciary. Detroit: Gale Research, 1976.
 Black, Hugo L., "Mr. Justice Murphy." 48 Michigan Law Review 739 (1950).
 
 "Frank Murphy, Dictionary of American Biography.
 Fine, Sidney, Frank Murphy, Michigan's 35th Governor, Archives of Michigan.
 Fine, Sidney, Frank Murphy in World War I (Ann Arbor: Michigan Historical Collections, 1968), photos, 44 pp.
 
 
 
 
 Friend, Theodore, Between Two Empires: The Ordeal of the Philippines, 1929–1946 (1965).
 Hall, Kermit L. (2005) "Murphy, Frank." The Oxford Companion to the Supreme Court of the United States. Oxford Oxfordshire: Oxford University Press 1150 pp. ; .
 
 Howard, J. Woodford, Jr., Mr. Justice Murphy: A Political Biography  (Princeton, New Jersey: Princeton University Press: 1968).
 Lopez, Ian F. Haney, "A nation of minorities: race, ethnicity, and reactionary colorblindness" , Stanford Law Review, February 1, 2007.
 Lunt, Richard D., The High Ministry of Government: The Political Career of Frank Murphy (Detroit: Wayne State University Press, 1965) (PhD diss. University of New Mexico).
 Marshall, Thurgood. "Mr. Justice Murphy and Civil Rights." 48 Michigan Law Review 745 (1950).
 
 Maveal, Gary, "Michigan Lawyers in History – Justice Frank Murphy, Michigan's Leading Citizen", 79 Michigan Bar Journal 368 (March 2000).
 Nawrocki, Dennis Alan, Art in Detroit Public Places (Detroit: Wayne State University Press, 1980), p. 63, biographical material on Frank Murphy.
 Norris, Harold, Mr. Justice Murphy and the Bill of Rights (Dobbs Ferry, New York: Oceana Publications, Inc., 1965).
 Ossian Sweet Murder Trial Scrapbook, 1925. Scrapbook and photocopy of the November 1925 murder trial of Ossian Sweet. Clarke Historical Library, Central Michigan University.
 Roche, John P. "Mr. Justice Murphy", Mr. Justice, Dunham, Allison and Kurland, Philip B., eds, 281–317 (Chicago: University of Chicago Press, 1956, rev. edn 1964).
 St. Antoine, Theodore J., "Justice Frank Murphy and American labor law", Michigan Law Review (100 MLR 1900, June 1, 2002).
 Toms, Robert, Speech on the Sweet murder trials upon retirement of the prosecuting attorney in 1960, Clarke Historical Library, Central Michigan University.
 
 
 
 .
 
 .

External links

 
 Gubernatorial photographic portrait of Frank Murphy, Michigan archives. 
 National Governors Association, Frank Murphy Biography.
 Photograph, Franklin Roosevelt, Eleanor Roosevelt and Frank Murphy, Virtual Detroit, The Detroit News.
 The Sweet Trials University of Detroit Mercy.
 The Sweet Trials home page, Famous American Trials, University of Missouri, Kansas City.
 Time magazine cover, Frank Murphy, August 28, 1939.
 
 United States Conference of Mayors on Frank Murphy
 United States Department of Justice, Biographies of U.S. Attorneys General, Frank Murphy.

|-

|-

|-

|-

|-

|-

1890 births
1949 deaths
20th-century American judges
20th-century American politicians
Alumni of Trinity College Dublin
American expatriates in the Philippines
American legal scholars
United States Army personnel of World War I
United States Army personnel of World War II
American people of Irish descent
Assistant United States Attorneys
Burials in Michigan
Catholics from Michigan
Deaths from coronary thrombosis
Democratic Party governors of Michigan
Franklin D. Roosevelt administration cabinet members
Governors-General of the Philippine Islands
High Commissioners to the Philippines
Legal history of Michigan
Mayors of Detroit
Michigan lawyers
Michigan state court judges
Military personnel from Michigan
People from Harbor Beach, Michigan
Presidents of the United States Conference of Mayors
United States Army officers
United States Attorneys General
United States federal judges appointed by Franklin D. Roosevelt
Justices of the Supreme Court of the United States
University of Detroit Mercy faculty
University of Michigan Law School alumni